CTU2 (formerly known as C16orf84) is a human gene located on chromosome 16.  The mRNA encodes the longer isoform.  The gene encodes a cytoplasmic protein that plays a probable role in tRNA modification.

References

External links

Further reading

 
 

Human proteins